The Saldurspitze or Salurnspitze is a mountain in the Saldurkamm group of the Ötztal Alps. It forms a double peak with the slightly higher Lagaunspitze to the southeast.

Mountains of South Tyrol
Mountains of the Alps
Alpine three-thousanders
Ötztal Alps